USS Calypso has been the name of more than one United States Navy ship, and may refer to:

 , an armed steamer in commission from 1863 to 1865
 , a patrol boat in commission from 1917 to 1919
 , an auxiliary ship in commission from 1941 to 1942

United States Navy ship names